Kaos is an upcoming mythological dark-comedy  television series created by Charlie Covell for Netflix. The series revolves around six humans as they discover their connection to each other and to a long standing ancient prophecy while they deal with corrupt and arrogant gods of the Greek mythology.

Premise 
An all-powerful God, yet insecure, Zeus started to fear his end of reign once he noticed a wrinkle on his forehead, possibly indicating the end of the world. He became paranoid and vengeful towards his lieges, and later, six humans connected with the ancient prophecy possibly related to his end of reign and the possible apocalypse of the earth. Meanwhile, the six humans starts to discover their connections with each other and grand conspiracies involving the Greek gods.

Cast 
 Jeff Goldblum as Zeus
 Janet McTeer as Hera
 Cliff Curtis as Poseidon
 David Thewlis as Hades
 Killian Scott as Orpheus
 Debi Mazar as Medusa
 Aurora Perrineau as Riddy
 Misia Butler as Caneus
 Leila Farzad as Ari
 Nabhaan Rizwan as Dionysus
 Rakie Ayola 
 Stanley Townsend
 Billie Piper
 Fady Elsayed

Production

Development 
On 10 June 2018, it was revealed that Netflix commissioned Kaos of 8-part one hour series order produced by Sisters Media. Charlie Covell served as the creator and executive producer. It was also revealed that Nina Lederman of All3Media alongside Tanya Seghatchian and John Woodward of Brightstar will join Charlie Covell as co-executive producers. Later, it was announced that Michael Eagle Hodgson, Harry Munday and Katie Carpenter would serve as the series producers and Georgi Banks Davies confirmed to be the lead director and co-executive producers. Runyararo Mapfumo directs the second block of the series. On 13 July 2022, it was revealed that Georgia Christou will serve as the writer for episode 6.

Casting 
On 27 May 2022, Aurora Perrineau was cast as Riddy, one of the main leads in the series. On 29 June 2022, more cast members were revealed, as Hugh Grant, Janet McTeer, David Thewlis, Nabhaan Rizwan, Cliff Curtis, Killian Scott, Leila Farzad, and Misia Butler joined the series. Other cast members are Rakie Ayola and Stanley Townsend who were cast in undisclosed roles. Additionally, Billie Piper also joined the cast in a minor role. On 13 July 2022, Jeff Goldblum replaced Grant as Zeus as the latter had to pull out due to date availability issues. On 22 August 2022, Debi Mazar joined the cast as the reimagined version of Medusa.

Filming 
On 22 August 2022, it was revealed that the series had begun filming in Spain.

References

External links 

Upcoming Netflix original programming
English-language Netflix original programming
Television series based on mythology
Television series based on classical mythology
British black comedy television shows
Television shows filmed in Spain
Television shows filmed in the United Kingdom
Television series by All3Media